Lukáš Rapant (born 16 November 1982, in Havířov) is a Czech rugby union footballer. His current position is Prop. His test debut for Czech Republic was in 2003 against Portugal in Lisbon. They lost that game 43-10. He signed for the Harlequins in March 2010.

References

1982 births
Living people
Czech rugby union players
Rugby union props
People from Havířov
Sportspeople from the Moravian-Silesian Region